Javerne is an alpine pasture located in the municipality of Bex, in Switzerland. The name of the locality might be used to describe the little valley itself: "vallon de Javerne".

References

Landforms of the canton of Vaud